The England women's national beach soccer team represents England in international women's beach soccer competitions and is controlled by England Beach Soccer — independent of the governing body of football in England, The Football Association. The team was created in 2012, winning their first trophy, the Women's Euro Beach Soccer Cup, in 2017.

In 2019, the team qualified for the World Beach Games where they represented Great Britain, winning the silver medal.

Current squad
As of July 2017 (Chosen for the 2017 Euro Beach Soccer Cup)

Competitive record

Women's Euro Beach Soccer Cup

World Beach Games

Results and fixtures

By year
The team's first international match took place on 20 June 2014, as part of ITV's Fever Pitch, a companion to the 2014 FIFA World Cup.

2012

2014

2015

2016

2017

2018

2019

*unofficial opposition

Head-to-head records
Includes competitive and friendly matches and those as Great Britain.

References

External links
England Beach Soccer Website
Beach Soccer Worldwide profile

European women's national beach soccer teams
Women's national sports teams of England